The  is a railway line in Hokkaido, Japan, operated by Hokkaido Railway Company (JR Hokkaido), between Tomakomai Station in Tomakomai and Samani Station in Samani, running along the coast of Hidaka Subprefecture. Services on the 116.0 km (72.1 mi) section of the line beyond Mukawa Station were suspended indefinitely since January 2015 due to storm damage. This section was closed on 1 April 2021 and replaced by a bus service. The closure of this section made the line the shortest in Japan to be classified as a 'main line', at just 30.5 km (19.0 mi), beating the Rumoi Main Line's length of 50.1 km (31.1 mi), which was previously the shortest.

Services

All regular trains are local trains, which stop at all stations, except Hama-Taura that may be skipped by some trains.

Stations

History

The lines were nationalized on 1 August 1927, and merged into one, becoming the Hidaka Line.

With the privatization of JNR on 1 April 1987, the line came under the control of JR Hokkaido.

Service suspension
Following storm damage between Atsuga and Ōkaribe stations on 8 January 2015, rail services had been suspended on the 116.0 km (72.1 mi) section beyond Mukawa station, with buses providing a substitute service. Further damage was caused to the line by Typhoon 17 on 12 September 2015, and no date had been set for the resumption of rail services beyond Mukawa. In December 2016, JR Hokkaido announced that it had abandoned plans to reopen the suspended section of the line, and was in discussion with the local governments involved.

Due to low ridership and very high maintenance costs, including coastal defences between Atsuga and Ōkaribe, JR Hokkaido held several meetings and conferences with the 7 towns along the suspended segment of the line, suggesting that repair of the line be abandoned and replaced by a bus service. In November 2019, 6 out of the 7 towns agreed that the damaged section be replaced by a bus service. However, the town of Urakawa still strongly requested for the whole line to be repaired; Urakawa's mayor reasoned that it would still take a while for the 'developing' Hidaka Expressway to reach the town, therefore it being necessary for the line to remain in service.

In September 2020, after 5 years of various meetings and discussions, many of which involved extensive arguments and disagreements, all 7 towns eventually came to the decision, along with JR Hokkaido, that the damaged section be abandoned and replaced with a bus service. The 116.0 km (72.1 mi) section was formally closed on 1 April 2021.

See also
 List of railway lines in Japan

References

External links
 JR Hokkaido official website

Rail transport in Hokkaido
Lines of Hokkaido Railway Company
1067 mm gauge railways in Japan
2 ft 6 in gauge railways in Japan